Gorkha Stadium is a multi-purpose stadium in Lebong, Darjeeling, India. It has a seating capacity of 15,000 people, and is used for several events like association football, cricket, and cultural events.

Gorkha Stadium was built in 1993. As of 2004 it is half completed. Nowadays, this ground is used for political purposes.

References

Multi-purpose stadiums in India
Football venues in West Bengal
Sports venues in West Bengal
Buildings and structures in Darjeeling district
1993 establishments in West Bengal
Sports venues completed in 1993
20th-century architecture in India